Gyula Rábai (born 2 June 1942 in Székesfehérvár) is a Hungarian former sprinter who competed in the 1964 Summer Olympics.

References

1942 births
Living people
Hungarian male sprinters
Olympic athletes of Hungary
Athletes (track and field) at the 1964 Summer Olympics
Sportspeople from Székesfehérvár
Universiade medalists in athletics (track and field)
Universiade gold medalists for Hungary
Medalists at the 1963 Summer Universiade
Medalists at the 1965 Summer Universiade
20th-century Hungarian people
21st-century Hungarian people